This list of historic houses in metropolitan Copenhagen provides an overview of historic houses in metropolitan Copenhagen, Denmark.

Central Copenhagen

Suburbs

Gentofte Municipality

Gladsaxe Municipality

Hørsholm Municipality

Lyngby-Taarbæk Municipality

Rudersdal Municipality

Surroundings

Egedal Municipality

Fredensborg Municipality

Frederikssund Municipality

Furesø Municipality

Gribskov Municipality

Halsnæs Municipality

Helsingør Municipality

Hillerød Municipality

Køge Municipality

See also
 List of historic houses on Funen
 List of historic houses on Lolland
 List of primary schools in Copenhagen

References

Houses in Denmark
Houses
Historic houses